Spain competed at the 1969 European Athletics Championships in Athens, Greece, from 16–21 September 1969.

Results

Men
Track & road events

Field events

Combined events – Decathlon

Nations at the 1969 European Athletics Championships
1969
European Athletics Championships